Evoca Cola is a cola-flavoured carbonated soft drink. It is produced by Evoca Drinks, a London-based soft drinks company, and is sold in the United Kingdom, The Channel Islands, Europe and the Far East.

History
Evoca Drinks was established in May 2003 in the United Kingdom and launched its flagship product, Evoca Cola, in January 2004.

Evoca Cola was the first and still is the only cola in the world to contain a tasteless extract of black seed (Nigella sativa).  After initial piloting in London, it was advertised on cable channels with its 'Power of Black Seed' and 'The Original Black Seed Cola' slogans.  It relaunched its brand in June 2005 to challenge global soft drink manufacturers such as Coca-Cola and Pepsi-Cola with its own 'Evoca Taste Challenge'.  Although Evoca Cola is very similar in taste to Coca-Cola and Pepsi-Cola, it differs in its composition by being made with natural mineral water and with the addition of a special tasteless black seed extract.

Evoca Cola launched its new television advertising campaign airing on cable/sky channels. The adverts drew comparisons with Red Bull animated adverts.

Brand Ambassadors have previously been a number of British, English and Commonwealth boxing champions including Danny Williams and Adnan Amar.
The association with boxing and sports came about due to the tagline 'Evoca Cola - The Power Of Black Seed' alluding to the supposed benefits of the added ingredient.

Market Positioning
In the UK Evoca Cola faced challenges from other brand competitors such as Virgin Cola but retained a presence in the market with a consistent client base due to its claims to hold a solid commitment to adhere to an 'exemplary level of quality, in its composition and taste' .

Vendors of the cola have highlighted the presence of black seed, as black seed is well known in a number of different cultures for its alleged benefits.

It has largely growing mainstream appeal as a result of its unique composition among rival brands (it is sold nationally in UK Asda stores), choosing to highlight USP's such as the use of 100% mineral water and natural ingredients only, subsequently positioning itself as an 'Ultra Premium Soft Drinks Brand'.

Other cola companies historically have never discussed or focused on the actual ingredients used in their colas, and what was inside the drink was always a 'trade secret', whilst focus was put almost exclusively on the image of the brands themselves. Evoca Cola tried to draw consumer attention to the quality aspects of the actual ingredients used to make the drink itself (a unique positioning among carbonated soft drinks - one would expect this from functional sports beverages for example) as they realised that this was the only way to attract customers who were used to drinking the market leading brands, by the proposition that they are claiming to offer a higher quality alternative to the market leaders.

See also
Nigella sativa

References

Cola brands
Soft drinks